Dion Lamont Foxx (born June 11, 1971) is a former American football linebacker in the National Football League. Dion Foxx played for the Miami Dolphins, the Washington Redskins, and the Green Bay Packers.  Foxx's playing career also included stints in the Canadian Football League, Spring Football League and XFL.  Foxx began as a stand out player at Meadowbrook High School. Foxx went on to become a dominant Linebacker at James Madison University. In recent years, he has taught at the middle school and high school levels, and coaches high school football.  Foxx is currently the Athletic Director at George Wythe High School in Richmond, Virginia.  He is also a member of Omega Psi Phi fraternity.

References

1971 births
Living people
American football linebackers
Miami Dolphins players
Washington Redskins players
Birmingham Thunderbolts players